Mansour Al Borki (born July 3, 1985) is a Libyan football midfielder who has played top-level football in the leagues of Libya and Tunisia and plays internationally for Libya.

Al Borki was a member of the Libya squad at the 2009 African Championship of Nations, but did not appear in any matches at the finals.

References

External links

1985 births
Living people
Libyan footballers
Association football midfielders
Al-Ittihad Club (Tripoli) players
JS Kairouan players
Libya international footballers
Libyan Premier League players